Shirley's Sounds is a studio album by organist Shirley Scott recorded mainly in 1958 for Prestige but not released until 1961 as PRLP 7195.

Reception

The contemporaneous DownBeat reviewer, Leonard Feather, praised the playing, while observing that there was little to distinguish the album from the large volume of other LPs by Hammond players. The AllMusic review stated "it's superior early organ jazz, full-sounding but streamlined owing to the trio format".

Track listing 
 "It Could Happen to You" (Johnny Burke, Jimmy Van Heusen) - 4:32
 "Summertime" (George Gershwin, DuBose Heyward) - 4:00
 "There Will Never Be Another You" (Harry Warren, Mack Gordon) - 3:24
 "Bye Bye Blackbird" (Ray Henderson, Mort Dixon) - 6:38
 "S'Posin'" (Paul Denniker, Andy Razaf) - 4:20
 "Baby Won't You Please Come Home" (Charles Warfield, Clarence Williams) - 4:04
 "Indiana" (Ballard MacDonald, James F. Hanley) - 3:25
 "I Can't See for Lookin'" (Nadine Robinson, Dok Stanford) - 4:11

Personnel 
 Shirley Scott - organ
 George Tucker (#4), George Duvivier (all others) - bass
 Arthur Edgehill - drums

References 

1961 albums
Albums produced by Bob Weinstock
Albums recorded at Van Gelder Studio
Prestige Records albums
Shirley Scott albums